N. gracilis may refer to:
 Naticopsis gracilis, an extinct sea snail species in the genus Naticopsis and the family Neritopsidae
 Nectandra gracilis, a plant species found in Ecuador and Peru
 Neolamprologus gracilis, a fish species endemic to Lake Tanganyika
 Nepenthes gracilis, the slender pitcher-plant, a very common lowland pitcher plant
 Nyctosaurus gracilis, a pterodactyloid pterosaur species

See also
 Gracilis (disambiguation)